The 2006–07 Irish Cup was the 127th edition of Northern Ireland's premier football knock-out cup competition. It concluded on 5 May 2007 with the final.

Linfield were the defending champions, winning their 37th Irish Cup last season after a 2–1 win over archrivals Glentoran in the 2006 final. They successfully defended the cup by defeating Dungannon Swifts 3–2 on penalties, when the final ended 2–2 after extra time. This was the first, and to date only Irish Cup final ever to be decided by a penalty shootout.

Results

First preliminary round

|}

Second preliminary round

|}

First round

|}

Second round

|}

Third round

|}

Fourth round

|}

Fifth round

|}

Replays

|}

Sixth round

|}

Quarter-finals

|}

Replay

|}

Semi-finals

|}

Final

References

2006-07
2006–07 domestic association football cups
Cup